Power Maxed Racing is a British auto racing team based in Bidford-on-Avon, Warwickshire. The team has raced in the British Touring Car Championship, since 2015 after purchasing BTC Racing in February 2015.

British Touring Car Championship

Chevrolet Cruze (2015–2016)
After having purchased BTC Racing in February 2015, the team will enter the 2015 British Touring Car Championship season with Dave Newsham and Josh Cook driving an NGTC Chevrolet Cruze each. The last season with the Chevrolet Cruze saw Emmerdale star Kelvin Fletcher take the wheel. Fletcher did not have a very successful season and was dropped from the team.

Vauxhall Astra (2017–present)

On 22 November 2016 Power Maxed Racing announced that Vauxhall would be returning to BTCC with the Astra for the 2017 season.

The 2017 drivers were Tom Chilton and Senna Proctor. Senna secured victory in the prestigious Jack Sears Trophy, awarded to best rookie, with an unprecedented 5 rounds of the season left to run. The car earned a number of podiums under Tom Chilton and guest driver, WTCC Champion Rob Huff.

2018 saw 2015 Jack Sears Champion Josh Cook return to PMR alongside Proctor. Proctor would take both his and the team's first win in the second race at Brands Hatch, after gambling with slick tyres on a drying track. This was followed up by Cook taking the team's first pole position three weeks later at Donington Park, before converting it into his first win in race 1. Cook would go on to take another win in Race 2 at Thruxton , while Proctor would take 2 more podiums throughout the rest of the season. Cook finished the season in 6th with 246 points, with Proctor in 12th with 170 points to round out the team's best year in the sport.

For 2019, they signed Jason Plato and Rob Collard and will run under the name Sterling Insurance with Power Maxed Racing.

Touring Car Trophy

Vauxhall Astra (2019)

Power Maxed Racing entered a BTCC-spec Vauxhall Astra in the finale of the 2019 Touring Car Trophy for series organiser Stewart Lines.

TradePriceCars.com (2020)

Power Maxed Racing has announced it will make the move into TCR UK for the 2020 season full-time in partnership with TradePriceCars.com. The team will run a Cupra León TCR in the series, with Trade Price Cars owner Dan Kirby the driver.

Engineering

Power Maxed Racing are renowned for their skills in project management. From initial design, through development, to finished product, the company has built a number of successful racing cars being campaigned across Europe.

References

External links
Power Maxed Racing official website

British Touring Car Championship teams
2015 establishments in the United Kingdom
British racecar constructors
Auto racing teams established in 2015